Ernest Aubrey Ball (22 December 1909, Grady County, Oklahoma – 30 August 1997, Santa Cruz) was an American professor of botany and a pioneer of meristem culture.

Education and career
After secondary education in Chickasha, Oklahoma, Ball studied for brief periods from 1931 to 1933 at Los Angeles City College and from 1933 to 1934 at the University of California, Los Angeles. He enrolled in 1935 at the University of Oklahoma and graduated there in 1937 with a B.S. in botany and in 1938 with an M.S. in botany. He received a Ph.D. in 1941 from the University of California, Berkeley.

Ball worked from 1941 to 1942 at Yale University, from 1942 to 1943 at the Carnegie Institution, and from 1943 to 146 at Harvard University. From 1946 to 1968 he was in the botany department of North Carolina State University. He was a Guggenheim Fellow for the academic year 1960–1961. From 1968 to 1977 he was a professor of botany at the University of Irvine. There he worked with Joseph Arditti on tissue culture of orchid leaf cells. In 1977 Ball moved to the University of California, Santa Cruz to continue working on tissue culture in redwoods.

In the 1970s and 1980s, the Simpson Timber Company invested in Ball's research on tissue-cultured redwoods. He planted 300 cloned redwoods on the U.C. Irvine campus but by 2012 most were dead and the remainder were in poor condition.

Selected publications

 1976

References

1909 births
1997 deaths
20th-century American botanists
University of Oklahoma alumni
UC Berkeley College of Natural Resources alumni
North Carolina State University faculty
University of California, Irvine faculty
People from Grady County, Oklahoma